Super Ace may refer to:

 Pober Super Ace, a single-seat sport kitplane
 Chrislea Super Ace, a four-seat light plane
 Tata Super Ace, a 1-ton mini truck
 Super Ace, a nylon-stringed electric guitar designed by Paul McGill